The cantonof Gignac is an administrative division of the Hérault department, southern France. Its borders were modified at the French canton reorganisation which came into effect in March 2015. Its seat is in Gignac.

Composition

It consists of the following communes:

 Aniane
 Arboras
 Argelliers
 Aumelas
 Bélarga
 La Boissière
 Campagnan
 Gignac
 Jonquières
 Lagamas
 Montarnaud
 Montpeyroux
 Plaissan
 Popian
 Le Pouget
 Pouzols
 Puéchabon
 Puilacher
 Saint-André-de-Sangonis
 Saint-Bauzille-de-la-Sylve
 Saint-Guilhem-le-Désert
 Saint-Guiraud
 Saint-Jean-de-Fos
 Saint-Pargoire
 Saint-Paul-et-Valmalle
 Saint-Saturnin-de-Lucian
 Tressan
 Vendémian

Councillors

On January 29, 2017, Louis Villaret announces his resignation from his mandate as departmental councillors. He is replaced by his substitute, Jean-François Soto.

Pictures of the canton

References

External links

Site of INSEE

Gignac